The Three Brothers of Grugith is a prehistoric site, a dolmen of the Neolithic Age, near St Keverne in Cornwall, England. It is a scheduled monument.

Description
The dolmen is situated near the summit of a hill overlooking Goonhilly Downs. Two orthostats support a capstone; there are depressions on the capstone which may be cup marks, or may be naturally formed.

References

Dolmens in Cornwall
Scheduled monuments in Cornwall
Lizard Peninsula